is a Fukuoka-born singer, actor, and voice actor. He is probably best known for singing the openings to Hyakujuu Sentai Gaoranger, Baxinger, and the final ED to Braiger. He has starred in several stage productions. In television he had a guest-star role in Gaoranger episode 6 and the role of Shishioh in Shuriken Sentai Ninninger. Yamagata performed the role of Kuro Bara Danshaku on the drama cd Cherry princess I. 
He is a close friend of fellow anison singer Isao Taira.

Television

Tokusatsu
Hyakujuu Sentai Gaoranger (Ayanosuke Yajima)
Hyakujuu Sentai Gaoranger The Movie (Hades Org (Voice))
Hikonin Sentai Akibaranger Season Tsuu (Illusion version of himself (ep. 3))
Shuriken Sentai Ninninger (Shishi-Oh)

References

1957 births
Living people
Actors from Fukuoka Prefecture
Japanese male voice actors
Japanese male singers
Musicians from Fukuoka Prefecture
Anime musicians